Open-source architecture is an emerging paradigm that advocates new procedures in imagination and formation of virtual and real spaces within a universal infrastructure. Drawing from references as diverse as open-source culture, modular design, avant-garde architectural, science fiction, language theory, and neuro-surgery, it adopts an inclusive approach as per spatial design towards a collaborative use of design and design tools by professionals and ordinary citizen users. The umbrella term citizen-centered design harnesses the notion of open-source architecture, which in itself involves the non-building architecture of computer networks, and goes beyond it to the movement that encompass the building design professions, as a whole.

History
Citizen-centered design was spearheaded in 1999 by academic research in leading universities, such as the University of Texas (SUPA) and professional practice organizations, such as the Earthnomad Foundation and ARK Tectonics, to position the citizen-centered design movement at the intersection of design and public policy. In the decades that followed, the movement grew to encompass various efforts around the globe, from organizations and collaborations to community design centers sponsored by academic institutions. The principles of the citizen-centered design movement and by extension, open-source architecture, were built on the body of knowledge accumulated since the 1960s on citizen participation research and practices.

Around the turn of the century,  citizen engagement research and practices were reformulated through the lens of more effective approaches and paradigms in the social and applied sciences, through the seminal work of Dr. Schaban-Maurer (2013), architect, urban planner and author of the deliberative design and phronetic engagement resource "Rise of the Citizen Practitioner" Dr. Schaban-Maurer laid out the principles and precepts of his 'Life-Experience Narrative Exchange' methodology in the Mindful Policy Engagement field, which he founded in 2013, with the ground-breaking work 'The Roles of the Citizen Practitioner in Citizen Engagement for Architecture, Urban Design and Urban Planning Policy: A Phronesis-Based Approach" The work provides rigorous theoretical basis for a body of best case studies and best practices of citizen-centered architecture, urban design and urban planning, as well as, urban and public policy. According to Dr. Schaban-Maurer, the (LENE) methodology leads to meaningful and effective design practices by integrating their processes with the principles of Phronetic Engagement and Mindful Policy into a new field of inquiry; 'Mindful Policy Engagement.' (Schaban-Maurer, 2013: 11)

Since then, open-source architecture practitioners and academics have increased the reach and influence of the citizen-centered design movement to other fields through inter-disciplinary collaborations, publications, conferences, and international exhibitions. In the last decade, open-source architecture, the mindful policy engagement field and the citizen-centered design movement have spawned smaller, derivative subsets of various names, most prominent of which is 'social impact design', 'public interest design' and the 'open architecture network' whose adherents combine design practice with social service. These early efforts, decades ago, are being propelled forward by new sensibilities through the continued commitment of architects, urban designers, planners, policy-makers and other stakeholders to engage and harness the knowledge of ordinary citizens in the design, development and implementation of urban policies, for projects that impact the very communities where we all live and work.

Cooking is often hailed as an early form of open source; vernacular architecture – producing recipes for everyday buildings – is another form of early lo-fi open-source culture, openly sharing and optimising technologies for building.

Funding

New economic models, exemplified by incremental microdonations and crowd-funding strategies like Sponsume and Kickstarter, offer new modes of project initiation and development, destabilising the traditionally feudal hierarchy of client/architect/occupant. Financing of private projects increasingly moves to the public domain, offering mass rather than singular ownership, whereas funding of public projects can be derived from more flexible, responsive frameworks than simple levies or taxation. Open-source architecture should have particular appeal for builders entirely outside the mainstream economy, such as squatters, refugees and the military.

Engagement

Open-source architecture relies upon amateurs as much as experienced professionals, the "genius of the mass" as much as that of the individual, eroding the binary distinction between author and audience. Like social software, it recognises the core role of multiple users at every stage of the project – whether as clients or communities, designers or occupants; at its best, it harnesses powerful network effects to scale systems effectively. It is typically democratic, enshrining principles of open access and participation, though political variations range from stealth authoritarianism to communitarian consensualism.

Traditional developments require engagement programmes in which the 'community' is 'consulted' with respect to incoming developments, often with blunt tools such as focus groups, which often result in lack of representation and input, or at worst can result in NIMBYism. With crowd-funded models, forms of engagement are built into the process, enabling a kind of emergent urbanism, in which use of space is optimised on terms set by its users. This reclamation of people's power can be seen as a soft, spatial version of Hacktivism. Open-source architecture is likely to suffer some of the organizational drawbacks of open-source software, such as forking of projects, abandoned projects, the emergence of cliques and incompatibility with the installed base of buildings. Organized campaigns of fear, uncertainty and doubt are probable.

Standards

An important aspect of open-source architecture is the emergence of open standards of collaboration. The establishment of common, open, modular standards (such as the grid proposed by the OpenStructures project addresses the problem of hardware compatibility and the interface between components, allowing collaborative efforts across networks in which everyone designs for everyone. The establishment of universal standards also encourages the growth of networks of non-monetary exchange (knowledge, parts, components, ideas) and remote collaboration.

Design

Mass customisation replaces standardisation as algorithms enable the generation of related but differentiated species of design objects. Parametric design tools like Grasshopper 3D, GenerativeComponents, Revit and Digital Project enable new user groups to interact with, navigate and modify the virtual designs, and to test and experience arrays of options at unprecedented low cost – recognizing laypeople as design decision making agents rather than just consumers. Open-source codes and scripts enable design communities to share and compare information and to collectively optimise production through modular components, accelerating the historical accumulation of shared knowledge. BIM (Building Information Modelling) and related collaboration tools and practices enable cross-disciplinary co-location of design information and integration of a range of platforms and timescales. Rapid prototyping and other 3D printing technologies enable instant production of physical artefacts, both representational and functional, even at an architectural scale, to an ever-wider audience.

There are severe criticisms of the use of currently popular design software, however, because of the impossibility of future residents and users to access them. P2P Urbanism promotes low-tech design solutions that collect traditionally-derived design knowledge and makes it available on an open-source web platform. This focus instead promotes traditional local materials and building techniques in vernacular architecture and is entirely distinct from that of the virtual design groups focusing upon the extremely expensive parametric design. The proponents of P2P Urbanism also philosophically oppose what they see as "fashionable" design approaches because of a link to unsustainable products, strong commercial interests, and total control by only a few participants—which is the opposite of opening up design to the whole population. In their view the point of open-source design should be to facilitate users designing and building their own dwellings, not to continue promoting a design elite that includes current starchitects.

Construction

The burgeoning open-source hardware movement enables sharing of and collaboration on the hardware involved in designing kinetic or smart environments that tightly integrate software, hardware, and mechanisms. Through these various tools, informed by sensor data, design becomes an ongoing, evolutionary process, as opposed to the one-off, disjointed fire-and-forget method of traditional design. This is an acknowledgement of the fact that design has always been an unending process, as well as a collaboration between users and designers. Operating systems for the design, construction and occupancy phases become possible, created as open platforms stimulating a rich ecosystem of 'apps'. Various practices jostle to become the Linux of architectural software, engaging in 'platform plays' at different scales rather than delivery of plans and sections. Embedded sensing and computing increasingly mesh all materials within the larger "Internet of things", evolving ever closer towards Bruce Sterling's vision of a world of Spimes. Materials communicate their position and state during fabrication and construction, aiding positioning, fixing and verification, and continue to communicate with distributed databases for the extent of their lifetime.

Occupancy

Today's OSArc enables inhabitants to control and shape their personal environment – “to Inhabit is to Design”, as John Habraken put it. This aspect is enhanced by today's fully sentient networked spaces, constantly communicating their various properties, states and attributes – often through decentralised and devolved systems. Crucial system feedback is supplied by a wide range of users and occupants, often either by miniature electronic devices or mobile phones – crowdsourcing (like crowd-funding) large volumes of small data feeds to provide accurate and expansive real-time information. Personalisation replaces standardisation as spaces 'intelligently' recognise and respond to individual occupants. Representations of spaces become as vital after construction as they are before; real-time monitoring, feedback and ambient display become integral elements to the ongoing life of spaces and objects. Maintenance and operations become extended inseparable phases of the construction process; a building is never "complete" in open-source architecture's world of growth and change.

If tomorrow's buildings and cities will be like "computers to live in" (see also: smart city) open-source architecture provides an open, collaborative framework for writing their operating software in real world conditions reflecting the principles of the citizen-centered architecture movement, as well as, the mindful policy engagement field, namely, unique designs for unique contexts, reflecting individual users' values through value rational planning and engagement-based praxis.

See also

References

Bibliography

 Various authors, Open Source Architecture, Domus 948 (June 2011)
 Sterling, B. 'Beyond the Beyond’ Blog on Wired Magazine
 Habraken, J. 1972, Supports – An Alternative to Mass Housing, London (The Architectural Press), 
 Leadbeater, C. 2008, We-think: The Power of Mass Creativity, London (Profile Books), 
 Botson, R. and Rogers, R. 2010, What's Mine is Yours: The Rise of Collaborative Consumption, New York City (HarperCollins), 
 Salingaros, N. A. 2010, "P2P Urbanism"
 Shepard, M. (editor), 2011, Sentient City: Ubiquitous Computing, Architecture, and the Future of Urban Space, Boston (MIT Press), 
 Price, C., Banham, R., Barker, P. and Hall, P., 1969, 'Non Plan: an experiment in freedom' in New Society (338)
 Kelly, K. 1994, Out of Control: the rise of neo-biological civilization, New York City (Perseus Books), 
 Open Building Network – Working Commission W104 ‘Open Building Implementation’ of the CIB – The International Council for Research and Innovation in Building and Construction (meets in a different country every year since its first meeting in Tokyo in 1994)
 Kaspori, D. 2003, ‘A Communism of Ideas: towards an architectural open source practice’ in Archis,
 Haque, U. 2003–05 Open Source Architecture Experiment,
 The University of Texas at Arlington, School of Urban and Public Affairs 'School of Urban and Public Affairs (SUPA) < University of Texas Arlington'
 Fuller, M. and Haque, U. 2008, ‘Urban Versioning System 1.0’ in Situated Technologies Pamphlet Series, New York City (Architectural League of New York)
 Kent Larson, Stephen Intille, T.J. McLeish, Jennifer Beaudin, and R.E. Williams, Open Source Building: Reinventing Places of Living, July 15, 2004.
 B. Schaban-Maurer, Rise of the Citizen Practitioner: A Phronesis-Based Approach to Citizen Engagement and Social Policy , December 27, 2013.
 B. Schaban-Maurer, The roles of the citizen practitioner in citizen engagement for architecture, urban design, and planning policy: A Phronesis-based approach , January 31, 2013.

Architecture
Open design